Tina Anderson is an American comic writer. She creates gay comics and women's yaoi, or Boys' Love. Anderson coined the term "GloBL" to encourage fans of yaoi/BL to think about implications of a BL aesthetic outside of Japanese culture. Anderson has written graphic novels and short stories that are included in collections from various publishers such as Class Comics, Yaoi Press, Sin Factory, DramaQueen, and Iris Print. Anderson stated in a November 2010 interview that 2011 would be her final year writing homoerotic graphic novels. Collected episodes of Anderson's online science fiction serial Femitokon debuted in December 2020 as an original English-language light novel called Suffocation. The second volume, titled Tactical Pursuits, released in August 2021.

Selected works
 Suffocation: The Femitokon Series Volume I
Tactical Pursuits: The Femitokon Series Volume II
Games With Me Omnibus graphic novel, (art by Lynsley Brito)
 Loud Snow graphic novel, art by Amelie Belcher
 Only Words graphic novel, art by Caroline Monaco
 Diplomatic Immunity art by Caroline Monaco
 Ungestellt featured in Lemon Law 2
 King's Masterpiece featured in Yaoi Hentai
 Closed Flower featured in Saihôshi the Guardian
 Snow Demon featured in Enslaved by the Dragon
 In Motion featured in When Worlds Collide
 Roulette featured in RUSH anthology from publisher DramaQueen
 Gadarene novel written with cb. Potts

References

External links
Official Tina Anderson Site
Interview with Tina Anderson at Anime News Network
Interview with Tina Anderson at Publishers Weekly

American comics writers
Female comics writers
Living people
Yaoi
21st-century American women writers
Place of birth missing (living people)
Year of birth missing (living people)